Gavrilovskaya is a rural locality (a village) in Spasskoye Rural Settlement, Tarnogsky District, Vologda Oblast, Russia. The population was 24 as of 2002.

Geography 
Gavrilovskaya is located 20 km northwest of Tarnogsky Gorodok (the district's administrative centre) by road. Verkhnepauninskaya is the nearest rural locality.

References 

Rural localities in Tarnogsky District